A brokered convention (sometimes referred to as an open convention and closely related to a contested convention), in US politics, can occur during a presidential election when a political party fails to choose a nominee on the first round of delegate voting at the party's nominating convention.

Once the first ballot, or vote, has occurred, if no candidate has a majority of the delegates' votes, the convention is then considered brokered. The nomination is then decided through a process of alternating political horse trading, delegate vote trading and additional revotes. In that circumstance, all regular delegates, who may have been pledged to a particular candidate according to rules, which vary from state to state, are "released" and may switch their allegiance to a different candidate before the next round of balloting. It is hoped that the extra privilege extended to the delegates will result in a revote that yields a clear majority of delegates for one candidate.

The term "brokered" implies a strong role for political bosses, which used to be more common and is associated with deals made in proverbial "smoke-filled rooms." The term "contested" is a more modern term for a convention in which no candidate holds a majority, but the role of party leaders is weaker in determining the eventual outcome.

For the Democratic Party, unpledged delegate votes, also called "superdelegate votes", used to be counted on the first ballot. The term "brokered convention" has referred to a convention whose outcome is decided by superdelegate votes, rather than pledged delegates alone, but that is not the original sense of the term and has not been a commonly-used definition for a "contested convention." As of 2018, Democratic superdelegates will participate only if no winner emerges after the first round of balloting.

Specific party rules

Democratic Party
Under the Democratic National Convention rules, "A majority vote of the Convention's delegates shall be required to nominate the presidential candidate" and "Balloting will continue until a nominee is selected." Superdelegates are party leaders who participate as delegates if no winner emerges after the first round. Prior to 2018, they were allowed to participate in the first round as well.

Republican Party
The rules are subject to change every election cycle and are determined by the Republican National Convention prior to the convention date. An example of this is Rule 40b of the RNC which was in effect in 2012, but was not adopted for the 2016 convention in Cleveland. Under this rule, a candidate must have the support of a majority of the delegates of at least eight states in order to get the nomination. Rule 40e then states that if no candidate has received the majority of votes, "the chairman of the convention shall direct the roll of the states be called again and shall repeat the calling of the roll until a candidate shall have received a majority of the votes."

In history
Before the era of presidential primary elections, political party conventions were routinely brokered.

The Democratic Party required two-thirds of delegates to choose a candidate at the first Democratic National Convention in 1832, and at all conventions until 1936. This made it far more likely to have a brokered convention, particularly when two strong factions existed: the most infamous example was at the 1924 Democratic National Convention in which the divisions between the wets and dries on ending Prohibition and various other issues led to 102 ballots of deadlock between the frontrunners, Alfred E. Smith and William G. McAdoo, over 17 days before dark horse candidate John W. Davis was chosen as a compromise on the 103rd ballot.

Adlai Stevenson II (of the 1952 Democratic Party) and Dwight D. Eisenhower (of the 1952 Republican Party) are the most recent presidential nominees of their respective parties who won their nominations at brokered conventions.

While Eisenhower had 595 delegates out of 1,206 in the first roll call, nine short of the majority required, delegates changed their votes before the official vote could be declared.

Conventions close to being brokered
Since 1952, there have been several years when brokered conventions were projected but did not come to pass:

 The 1968 Democratic National Convention might have been brokered if New York Senator Robert F. Kennedy had not been assassinated. He won five of the primaries, including California, but too few delegates were then selected by primaries to determine the presidential nominee. Minnesota Senator Eugene McCarthy had won six primaries. US President Lyndon B. Johnson, who had decided against running for a second full term, still controlled most of the party machinery and used it in support of US Vice President Hubert Humphrey, who did not contest the primaries personally although two surrogates won their home states. If Kennedy had lived, the first ballot at the convention could have been divided between Kennedy, McCarthy, and Humphrey delegates, with none gaining a majority.
 The 1968 Republican National Convention featured former Vice President Richard Nixon as the clear delegate leader, but figures such as New York Governor Nelson Rockefeller tried to prevent Nixon from gaining a majority. During the early days of the convention, Rockefeller supporters claimed that there was "erosion" among Nixon delegates. If there was any, it was minor, and Nixon was nominated on the first ballot.
 In the 1972 Democratic National Convention the delegate leader, Senator George McGovern of South Dakota, was not assured of victory until a procedural move to reject some of his California delegates was averted on the first day of the convention.
 In 1976, the Republican primaries gave President Gerald Ford a slight lead both in the popular vote and in delegates before the Republican National Convention, but he did not have enough delegates to secure the nomination. A brokered convention was predicted, but Ford managed to receive the necessary support on the first ballot to edge Ronald Reagan, a former governor of California. This is the most recent Republican presidential convention to have opened without the nominee having been decided in the primaries.
 In 1980, Senator Ted Kennedy, challenging incumbent President Jimmy Carter for the Democratic nomination, fell short in the primaries, but Kennedy was still urging delegates to switch over to him when he arrived at the Democratic convention in August. However, Carter won handily on the first ballot, and Kennedy dropped out of the running a few hours later.
 In 1984, as a result of the Democratic primaries, former Vice President Walter Mondale was the clear frontrunner but remained 40 delegates short of securing the nomination. His nomination had to be formalized at the convention, which was the last time that any presidential convention opened without the nominee having been decided in the primaries. However, a convention fight was unlikely, as rival Gary Hart was lobbying for the vice-presidential nomination and was resigned to the likely possibility that Mondale would be nominated for president. Mondale indeed received the overwhelming support of superdelegates on the first ballot and became the Democratic presidential candidate.

Races with failed predictions of being contested
 In 1988, a brokered convention was predicted for the Democrats. There was no clear frontrunner since Gary Hart had withdrawn. Also, Paul Simon, Richard Gephardt, Michael Dukakis, Al Gore, and Jesse Jackson had each won primaries. Dukakis was named the frontrunner by the media, as he drew support from all sections of the nation, and other candidates' support was largely limited to their native regions. He maintained the momentum and secured the nomination in the next round of primaries.
 For the 2008 election, there had been speculation that the Democratic Party's national convention might be brokered, or at least that the convention might commence without a presumptive nominee. For the Democrats, a brokered convention was considered possible, as it was unclear for a time whether either of the top two candidates, Senators Barack Obama and Hillary Clinton, would be able to win a majority of pledged delegates before the convention. The only other candidate to win delegates was Senator John Edwards, who withdrew after the first month of the contests. Although Edwards won fewer than 0.5% of the delegates, the race between Obama and Clinton was narrow. If neither candidate had a majority of delegates by the time the primaries finished on June 3, the candidates might have had to seek support from the undecided remainder of the superdelegates to secure a majority at the convention. Nancy Pelosi, the chair of the Democratic National Convention, had argued that the superdelegates should not overrule the results of the primaries. In the last week of the primaries, Howard Dean, the chair of the Democratic National Committee, called for the undecided remainder of the superdelegates to commit to either remaining presidential candidate. His intention was to ensure that the nomination would be decided once the last primaries concluded on June 3. In the end, a brokered convention did not occur since by June 3, Obama had enough pledged delegates and supportive superdelegates to secure a majority at the convention.
There was also speculation that the 2008 Republican primaries would result in a brokered convention because of the number of strong candidates and their different geographic bases. The large number of "winner-take-all" states benefited candidates with strong regional support. In addition, the weakened power of President George W. Bush to force candidates out of the race resulted in fewer levels of influence for them. At one point, it was thought likely that five different candidates would win five early contests (Mike Huckabee in Iowa, John McCain in New Hampshire, Mitt Romney in Nevada, Fred Thompson in South Carolina, and Rudy Giuliani in Florida). However, McCain won South Carolina and Florida in addition to New Hampshire and would remain dominant for the rest of the primary season and so a contested convention did not come close to happening.
In the 2016 Republican primaries, there was considerable speculation, from the party's opponents to the presidential candidate Donald Trump that a contested convention might take place. On March 16, 2016, Former Speaker of the House John Boehner said that in the case of a brokered convention, he would support the current Speaker of the House, Paul Ryan, for the nomination although Ryan was not a presidential candidate. Boehner's remarks sparked controversy by implying that the Republican Party did not have to select a candidate participating in the primary election process. Trump's significant victory in the Indiana primary on May 3, 2016 caused his final two opponents, Ted Cruz and John Kasich, to suspend their campaigns shortly afterward, and Trump, the only candidate who still had an active campaign, handily won all the remaining contests by reaching the 1,237 delegates needed to claim the nomination by May 26.

Reasons for rarity
Several factors encourage a clear and timely decision in the primary process.

Firstly, candidates tend to get momentum as they go through the process because of the bandwagon effect. Thus, one or two candidates will be portrayed by the media to voters as the frontrunners as a result of their placement in the first primaries and caucuses, and as also-ran candidates drop out, their supporters will tend to vote for one of the frontrunners. Theorists have identified two types of political momentum, piecemeal and all-at-once, with different impacts on front-runners and those right behind them.

Secondly, political parties wish to avoid the negative publicity from a brokered convention and to maximize the amount of time that the nominee has to campaign for the presidency.

Especially because of the desire to foster party unity in the months leading up to Election Day, it is considered possible, if not probable, for any "brokering" that may be required for a future presidential convention to take place in the weeks and months before the convention, once it becomes clear that no candidate will likely secure a majority of delegates without an agreement with one or more rivals. Such an agreement would likely commit the frontrunner to make some form of concession(s) in return, such as selecting the former rival as his/her vice presidential nominee. That was the case prior to the 1980 Republican National Convention. Former California Governor Ronald Reagan won the presidential nomination and chose George H. W. Bush as his vice-presidential nominee although President Gerald Ford was the frontrunner for the slot.

In popular culture
In the U.S. edition of House of Cards, two episodes of the fourth season center on an open convention run by the DNC. Incumbent Frank Underwood is easily nominated for the presidency, but the vice-presidential nomination is contested between Secretary of State Catherine Durant and First Lady Claire Underwood.

The last two episodes of season six of the US series The West Wing centers on the Democratic Party's nomination process while three candidates vie for the nomination: Vice President Bob Russell, Representative Matt Santos, and former Vice President John Hoynes. A fourth, Governor Eric Baker, attempts to get nominated from the floor after the first ballot fails to produce a nominee. Santos ultimately wins.

In the final season of satirical comedy series Veep, Selina Meyer gets caught in a brokered convention. She manages to win the nomination but only after a series of compromising decisions, including pledges to ban same-sex marriage and to open up federal land to oil drilling, which encourages Tom James' campaign manager to expose his sexual exploitation of her to derail his attempt to win the nomination and nominating the populist nativist Jonah Ryan as her running mate.

The 1964 film The Best Man, based on a play of the same name, centers on the actions of two presidential candidates vying for an unspecified political party's nomination leading up to and during a brokered convention.

See also
 2016 Democratic Party presidential primaries
 2016 Democratic National Convention
 2016 Republican Party presidential primaries
 2016 Republican National Convention

References

United States presidential nominating conventions